Anders Jektvik (born in Hitra, Norway on 14 June 1982) is a Norwegian musician, singer, songwriter and guitarist.

He started in the formation Tefeilles as a guitar player. Their debut album was To hjærta. He left the band and continued his career as a solo artist. On 1 February 2013, he released his debut solo album entitled Aill kjeinne aill.

In live performances, he is accompanied by fellow musicians under the name Anders Jektvik Trio, made up of Anders Jektvik (vocals, guitar), Aril Reiersen (bass, backing vocals) and Dan Åke Clausen (drums, backing vocals)

Norske Talenter
As a singer, he took part in the fifth season of the Norwegian reality television contest show Norske Talenter singing his own compositions including "Bare saind" and "Tøv". In the live final broadcast in December 2012, he finished runner-up with the title going to singer Stine Hole Ulla.

Discography

Albums
as part of Tefeilles
2007: To hjærta

Solo

References

External links
Official website

Norwegian songwriters
Norwegian musicians
1982 births
Living people
21st-century Norwegian singers
21st-century Norwegian male singers
People from Hitra